Monitor, West Virginia may refer to the following communities in West Virginia:
Monitor, Logan County, West Virginia
Monitor, Monroe County, West Virginia